Rạch Giá Stadium is a multi-use stadium in Rạch Giá, Kiên Giang, Vietnam. It is currently used mostly for football matches and is the home stadium of Kiên Giang F.C. The stadium holds 10,000 people.

References
 Profile

Football venues in Vietnam
Buildings and structures in Kiên Giang province